William Mullins (23 February 1920 – 27 December 2015) was an Irish equestrian. He competed in two events at the 1956 Summer Olympics.

References

External links
 

1920 births
2015 deaths
Irish male equestrians
Olympic equestrians of Ireland
Equestrians at the 1956 Summer Olympics
Place of birth missing